"Champion" is a pop song recorded by Swedish singer Agnes taken from her second album Stronger. The track was written by Agnes Carlsson, Curtis A. Richardson, and Emanuel Olsson and produced by Emanuel Olsson for Cosmos Productions. It was released as the album's second single in Sweden.

Music video
A music video was produced to promote the single. The video was directed by Peter Mars.

Track listing
CD-single (EAN 0886970414029)
(Released: November 22, 2006) (Columbia/Sony BMG)
"Champion" [Radio Edit] — 3:27
"Champion" [Instrumental] — 3:27

Digital download
(Released: November 15, 2006) (Columbia/Sony BMG)
"Champion" [Radio Edit] — 3:27

Chart performance

References

External links
Official Website
Official U.S. Website

2006 songs
Agnes (singer) songs
Songs written by Agnes (singer)
2006 singles